Ernest Charles Osborne (24 April 1873 – 25 March 1926) was an Australian cricketer who played first-class cricket for Cambridge University in three matches in 1894. He was born at Elsternwick, Victoria and died at Cardinia, Victoria. 

Osborne was educated at the Melbourne Church of England Grammar School and at Jesus College, Cambridge. Before arriving in England in 1891, he had played some cricket for Essendon Cricket Club in the precursor to the Victorian Premier Cricket competition as a lower-middle-order batsman and a fast-medium bowler – it is not known whether he was right- or left-handed. His cricket at Cambridge was limited to three games within 10 days in May 1894: he made little impact with the ball, and none at all as a batsman, and did not survive in the team long enough to win a Blue.

Osborne graduated from Cambridge University with both Bachelor of Arts and Bachelor of Laws degrees in 1894 and went back to Australia. He returned to Victoria club cricket with the Melbourne University team through to 1902. He qualified as a solicitor in Melbourne, but in the First World he returned to the UK where he obtained a commission in the Black Watch. He was wounded in the war and his death notice in 1926 states that he died as a result of his war-time injuries.

References

1873 births
1926 deaths
Australian cricketers
Cambridge University cricketers
People educated at Melbourne Grammar School
Alumni of Jesus College, Cambridge
British Army personnel of World War I
Black Watch officers
Military personnel from Melbourne
People from Elsternwick, Victoria
Cricketers from Melbourne